The men's singles event at the 2019 African Games was held from 24 to 29 August at the Cheminots Club.

Denis Indondo is the defending champion, but he doesn't participate in this year event.

This event is a qualification event to the 2020 Summer Olympics. The winner is qualify to the men's singles event, if he meets the following requirements: His ranking is within the top 300 on the ATP Singles Rankings of 7 June 2021 and doesn't qualify any other athlete from his nation via Direct Acceptance.

Mohamed Safwat of Egypt won the gold medal, defeating his fellow countryman Karim-Mohamed Maamoun in the final, 6–3, 6–4.

Medalists

Seeds

Draw

Finals

Top half

Section 1

Section 2

Bottom half

Section 3

Section 4

References

External links
 Draw

Tennis at the 2019 African Games